Møller Bank is a submerged bank, with least depth of , at the northern end of Kista Strait,  west of Welch Island, and just east of Carstens Shoal, in Holme Bay, Mac. Robertson Land, Antarctica. It was charted in February 1961 by d'A.T. Gale, a hydrographic surveyor with the Australian National Antarctic Research Expeditions (Thala Dan), and was named by the Antarctic Names Committee of Australia for J. Wennerberg Møller, third mate on the Thala Dan in 1961, who assisted in the hydrographic survey.

References

Undersea banks of the Southern Ocean
Landforms of Mac. Robertson Land

[-exref (icon_- rer=mutual ^string alpha(biregular) *oxyxssd refi=captcha (refinded (ref = 0,1---3^7af) opt (location=exer=mit) exortion=enable))O(KalifElSHariFF)